is a trans-Neptunian object in the scattered disc, around  in diameter. It was discovered on 24 January 2020, by American astronomers Scott Sheppard, David Tholen, and Chad Trujillo using the 8.2-meter Subaru Telescope of the Mauna Kea Observatories in Hawaii, and announced on 31 May 2021.

References

External links 
 
 

Minor planet object articles (unnumbered)

20200124